The Elie Wiesel Genocide and Atrocities Prevention Act of 2018, also known as the Elie Wiesel Act, GAPA or EWGAPA, is part of the 115th Congress, being S.1158 in the Senate and HR.3030 in the House. It was introduced in June 2017 and passed on December 21st 2018

According to the Congressional Research Service, this law directs the U.S. Department of State to provide additional training for Foreign Service Officers assigned to a country experiencing or at risk of mass atrocities, such as genocide or war crimes. The training shall include instruction on recognizing patterns of escalation and early signs of potential atrocities, and methods of preventing and responding to atrocities. The President shall report annually to Congress on U.S. efforts to prevent mass atrocities.

References

Acts of the 115th United States Congress
Genocide prevention